

First team squad

Transfers

Summer 

In:

Out:

Winter 

In:

Out:

Pre-season

Professzionális Nemzeti Bajnokság

Matches

League table

Results summary

Results by round

Hungarian Cup

External links
 Official Website
 PNB
 Soccerway

Budapesti VSC
Hungarian football clubs 1998–99 season